Porches may refer to:

 Porch, an architectural element
 Porches (Lagoa), a civil parish (freguesia) in the municipality of Lagoa, Algarve, Portugal
 Porches Pottery (Olaria Algarve), producer of hand-painted pottery
 Porches (band), an American synthpop project of New York-based musician Aaron Maine

See also 

 Porch (disambiguation)